Conor Gath (born 17 November 1980 in Drumcullen, County Offaly, Ireland) is an Irish sportsperson.  He plays hurling with his local club Drumcullen and was a member of the Offaly senior inter-county team from 2000 until 2004.

References

1980 births
Living people
Drumcullen hurlers
Offaly inter-county hurlers